The Coleraine Chronicle is a newspaper in Northern Ireland.
It was founded in 1844.
In 1934, it incorporated the Ballymoney Free Press.

References

External links
The Coleraine Chronicle is 175 years old; 17 April 2019
Official website

Newspapers published in Northern Ireland
Publications established in 1844